Lists of black people include:

Achievements
 List of black Academy Award winners and nominees
 List of black Golden Globe Award winners and nominees
 List of first black Major League Baseball players
 List of black Nobel Laureates

Fictional characters
 List of black animated characters
 List of black superheroes
 List of black video game characters

Nationality
 Lists of African Americans
 List of Afro-Latinos
 List of Akan
 List of Brazilians of Black African descent
 List of black Britons
 List of black Canadians
 List of Black Hebrew Israelites
 List of Igbo
 Lists of Indigenous Australians
List of Sierra Leone Creole people
 List of Xhosa
 List of Yoruba
 List of Zulu

Occupation
 List of African-American astronauts
 List of black British writers
 List of Black British artists
 List of black fashion models
 List of black photographers
 List of composers of African descent
 List of Indigenous Australian sportspeople
 List of National Hockey League players of black African descent

Religion
 List of Jewish African-Americans
 :Category:African-American Christians

Lists of people by ethnicity